Hieracium,
is a genus of flowering plant in the family Asteraceae, and closely related to dandelion (Taraxacum), chicory (Cichorium), prickly lettuce (Lactuca) and sow thistle (Sonchus),
which are part of the tribe Cichorieae. Hawkweeds, with their 10,000+ recorded species and subspecies, do their part to make Asteraceae the second largest family of flowering plants.
Some botanists group all these species or subspecies into approximately 800 accepted species, while others prefer to accept several thousand species. Since most hawkweeds reproduce exclusively asexually by means of seeds that are genetically identical to their mother plant (apomixis or agamospermy), clones or populations that consist of genetically identical plants are formed and some botanists (especially in UK, Scandinavia and Russia) prefer to accept these clones as good species (arguing that it is impossible to know how these clones are interrelated) whereas others (mainly in Central Europe and USA) try to group them into a few hundred more broadly defined species. What is here treated as the single genus Hieracium is now treated by most European experts as two different genera, Hieracium and Pilosella, with species such as Hieracium pilosella, Hieracium floribundum and Hieracium aurantiacum referred to the latter genus. Many members of the genus Pilosella reproduce both by stolons (runners like those of strawberries) and by seeds, whereas true Hieracium species reproduce only by seeds. In Pilosella, many individual plants are capable of forming both normal sexual and asexual (apomictic) seeds, whereas individual plants of Hieracium only produce one kind of seeds. Another difference is that all species of Pilosella have leaves with smooth (entire) margins whereas most species of Hieracium have distinctly dentate to deeply cut or divided leaves.

Description

Flowers and flower-heads
Hieracium or hawkweeds, like others in the family Asteraceae, mostly have yellow, 
tightly packed flower-heads of numerous small flowers
but, unlike daisies and sunflowers in the same family, they have not two kinds of florets but only strap-shaped (spatulate) florets, each one of which is a complete flower in itself, not lacking stamens,
and joined to the stem by leafy bracts.  As in other members of the tribe Cichorieae, each ray corolla is tipped by 3 to 5 teeth.

Bracts, stems and leaves
Erect single, glabrous or hairy stems, sometimes branched away from the point of attachment, sometimes branched throughout.

The hairiness of hawkweeds can be very complex: from surfaces with scattered to crowded, tapered, whiplike, straight or curly, smooth to setae; "stellate-pubescent" or surfaces with scattered to crowded, dendritically branched (often called, but seldom truly, "stellate") hairs; and "stipitate-glandular" or surfaces with scattered to crowded gland-tipped hairs mostly. Surfaces of stems, leaves, peduncles, and phyllaries may be glabrous or may bear one, two, or all three of the types of hairs mentioned above.

Like the other members of the Chicory tribe, hawkweeds contain a milky latex.

Ecology
The large yellow underwing moth (Noctua pronuba) feeds on Hieracium species.

Distribution
Hieracium species are native to Africa, Asia, Europe, North America, Central America and South America.

Species

The classification of Hieracium into species is notoriously difficult. One reason is the apomictic reproduction (in which plants asexually produce seeds), which tends to produce a lot of minor geographical variation. Over 9000 species names have been published in Hieracium but some botanists regard many of those as synonyms of larger species.

Europe
Hieracium attenboroughianum – Attenborough’s hawkweed
Hieracium bakerianum
Hieracium hethlandiae – Cliva Hill hawkweed
Hieracium lucidum Guss. – Sicilian sparviere
Hieracium insolitum (Zahn) Üksip
Hieracium villosum Jacq.

North America
The list below is a selection of species that have been accepted by the USDA Natural Resources Conservation Service and Canada.
A more complete list is given in the list of Hieracium species.

Hieracium albertinum – houndstongue hawkweed
Hieracium albiflorum Hook. – white hawkweed
Hieracium × alleghaniense Britt. (pro sp.)
Hieracium argutum Nutt. – southern hawkweed
Hieracium × atramentarium (Naegeli & Peter) Zahn ex Engl. (pro sp.)
Hieracium atratum Fries – polar hawkweed
Hieracium aurantiacum L. – orange hawkweed
Hieracium bolanderi Gray – Bolander's hawkweed
Hieracium × brachiatum Berth. ex DC.
Hieracium caespitosum Dumort. – meadow hawkweed
Hieracium canadense Michx. – Canada hawkweed
Hieracium carneum Greene – Huachuca hawkweed
Hieracium × fassettii Lepage
Hieracium fendleri Schultz-Bip. – yellow hawkweed
Hieracium × fernaldii Lepage
Hieracium flagellare Willd. – whiplash hawkweed
Hieracium floribundum Wimmer & Grab. – kingdevil hawkweed
Hieracium × fuscatrum Naegeli & Peter (pro sp.)
Hieracium glomeratum Froel. – queen-devil hawkweed
Hieracium gracile Hook. – slender hawkweed
Hieracium greenei Gray – Greene's hawkweed
Hieracium greenii Porter & Britt. – Maryland hawkweed
Hieracium × grohii Lepage
Hieracium gronovii L. – queendevil
Hieracium horridum Fries – prickly hawkweed
Hieracium kalmii L. – Kalm's hawkweed
Hieracium lachenalii K.C. Gmel. – common hawkweed
Hieracium lactucella Wallr. – European hawkweed
Hieracium laevigatum Willd. – smooth hawkweed
Hieracium lemmonii Gray – Lemmon's hawkweed
Hieracium longiberbe T.J. Howell – longbeard hawkweed
Hieracium longipilum Torr. – hairy hawkweed
Hieracium maculatum Sm. – spotted hawkweed
Hieracium marianum Willd. – Maryland hawkweed
Hieracium megacephalum Nash – coastal plain hawkweed
Hieracium murorum L. – wall hawkweed
Hieracium paniculatum L. – Allegheny hawkweed
Hieracium parryi Zahn in H.G.A. Engler – Parry hawkweed
Hieracium pilosella L. – mouse-ear hawkweed
Hieracium piloselloides Vill. – tall hawkweed
Hieracium praealtum Vill. ex Gochnat – kingdevil
Hieracium pringlei Gray – Pringle's hawkweed
Hieracium robinsonii (Zahn) Fern. – Robinson's hawkweed
Hieracium rusbyi Greene – Rusby's hawkweed
Hieracium sabaudum L. – New England hawkweed
Hieracium scabrum Michx. – rough hawkweed
Hieracium schultzii Fries – roughstem hawkweed
Hieracium scouleri Hook. – Scouler's woollyweed
Hieracium scribneri Small – Scribner's hawkweed
Hieracium traillii – Maryland hawkweed
Hieracium triste Willd. ex Spreng. – woolly hawkweed
Hieracium umbellatum L. – narrowleaf hawkweed
Hieracium venosum L. – rattlesnakeweed

Plant pest
All species of the genus Hieracium are classed as invasive species throughout New Zealand. They are banned from sale, propagation and distribution under the National Pest Plant Accord. Hieracium is a pasture weed that reduces available feed for livestock and displaces the indigenous plants. It is a particular threat in alpine ecosystems previously dominated by native tussocks, though it will colonise habitats from bare ground, to exotic pine forest, to native Southern Beech forest.

In the United States, many species of Hieracium have been introduced and all species present are considered noxious weeds in one or more states.

In Australia, hawkweeds are invasive pests in alpine regions, all species of Hieracium are listed or declared under various State Acts.

References

Further reading

 McCosh, D. and Rich, T.C.G. 209. Hieracium proximum (Caithness Hawkweed) in Ireland. Ir. Nat J. 30: 54.
 Rich, T.C.G., Cotton, D.C.F., Hood, R.L.I.B., Houston, L., McCosh, J. and Jackson, M.B.W. 2009. Conservation of Ireland's biodiversity: status of the Irish endemic Hieracium basalticola Pugsley (Basalt Hawkweed) (Asteraceae). Ir. Nat J. 30: 79–89.

External links

 
Asteraceae genera
Taxa named by Carl Linnaeus